Finance is the study of businesses and investments.

It may also refer to:
Finance (game), a board game
Finance (newspaper), a Slovenian newspaper
Finance (constituency), a Hong Kong constituency